Tawan Jiratchaya Kedkong (born 15 August 1995) is a Thai fashion model and winner of the fourth season of Asia's Next Top Model.

Asia's Next Top Model 
Tawan was one of two contestants who represented Thailand, the other being Maya Goldman. She was declared the best performer of the week in the fourth week of the competition; as a result, she was automatically put through to week six. Also, Subaru XV cars appointed her as their 2016 brand ambassador. In the 13th episode, Tawan was crowned as the winner of the fourth season of Asia's Next Top Model. 

After winning the competition she appeared in Cosmopolitan UK, Harper's Bazaar India, Vogue Thailand and Arabia. She graced the cover of Elle Croatia in August 2017.

References 

1995 births
Living people
Next Top Model winners
Tawan Kedkong
Tawan Kedkong